Mohammed Abdullah Al-Ajmi is a member of the Kuwaiti National Assembly, representing the fifth district. Born in 1971, Al-Ajmi obtained a PhD in management from Yarmouk University in Jordan and worked as a professor before being elected to the National Assembly in 2008.  Al-Ajmi is considered an Independent deputy.  He is a member of the Ajman tribe.

References

Members of the National Assembly (Kuwait)
Yarmouk University alumni

Living people

1971 births